Akmal Kholmatov (born 4 April 1976) is a former Tajikistani footballer.

Career

Club
Kholmatov played for Regar-TadAZ between 1993 and 1996. During 1996 Kholmatov moved to Uzbekistan, signing for Neftchi Fargʻona, and becoming an Uzbek citizen in 2001. After 12 years at Neftchi Fargʻona, Kholmatov moved to fellow Uzbek club Pakhtakor Tashkent for three seasons, before joining Iranian side PAS Hamedan in 2011. A year later Kholmatov returned to Uzbekistan with Lokomotiv Tashkent before rejoining Neftchi Fargʻona in 2014. Kholmatov left Neftchi Fargʻona at the end of the 2015 season. After leaving Neftchi Fargʻona, Kholmatov featured for FC Istiklol in the pre-season friendlies, scoring in a 3–1 defeat to Várda SE in February 2016. In June 2016, Kholmatov left FC Istiklol returning to Neftchi Fargʻona.

Name controversy
Kholmatov came under scrutiny in 2007, when the Asian Football Confederation launched an investigation into the identities of two Central Asian players who they believed had falsified documentation to play in AFC competitions. The investigation showed that the two players registered "Akmal Kholmatov" and "Akhmal Holmatov" were actually the same person.

International
Kholmatov played for Tajikistan between 2003 and 2007, taking part in their 2010 FIFA World Cup qualification campaign.

Career statistics

Club

International

Statistics accurate as of match played 18 November 2007

International goals
Goals for Senior National team

Honours

Club
Neftchi
 Uzbek League (1): 2001
Pakhtakor
 Uzbek Cup (1): 2009
 Istiklol
 Tajik Supercup (1): 2016

Individual
 Gennadi Krasnitsky club: 121 goals (as of 30 October 2016)

References

External links

1976 births
Living people
Tajikistani footballers
Tajikistani expatriate footballers
Tajikistan international footballers
Expatriate footballers in Iran
Expatriate footballers in Uzbekistan
Tajikistani expatriate sportspeople in Uzbekistan
Tajikistani expatriate sportspeople in Iran
FK Neftchi Farg'ona players
Pas players
Pakhtakor Tashkent FK players
PFC Lokomotiv Tashkent players
FC Istiklol players
Association football midfielders
Uzbekistan Super League players